Koi Aanay Wala Hai (Urdu: کوئی آنے والا ہے, literal English translation: "someone is coming")  is the fourth single by the pop band Strings from their fifth studio album, Koi Aanay Wala Hai (2008). One of String's well known track, "Koi Aanay Wala Hai" topped all Pakistani music charts upon its release.

Music video
The video starts off with Bilal Maqsood and Faisal Kapadia both band members performing and singing the song at the top of a building. Later on, John Abraham appears as an angel in the video following the female actor in the video. In the middle of the video, John Abraham lands on the surface with his wings around covering him and walks towards the female actor in the video. The angel's wings are shattered as they both get together and later the band is shown singing the song at the top of a building.

The basic concept of the video is, 'There is an angel watching over everyone.' John Abraham features as an angel who sights a beautiful girl in trouble. He falls in love with her and chooses to become human to be with her forever, similar to the concept of the film City of Angels.

The video was shot in Kuala Lumpur, Malaysia. Ad filmmaker and director of the video, Ravi Udyawar has shot on 35 mm, utilising significant post-production, with the SFX itself taking almost 3 months of work.

Track listing
Koi Aanay Wala Hai

Charts

References

External links
Strings Online - Official Website

2008 singles
Strings (band) songs
2008 songs
Sony BMG singles